The Markham Waxers were an Ontario Junior Hockey League (OJHL) Junior "A" ice hockey team based in Markham, Ontario, Canada.  The Waxers name is still used by the Markham Waxers minor hockey club with the Eastern AAA Hockey League, a sub league of the Ontario Minor Hockey Association.

History
Originally known as the Markham Jets, the Waxers organization changed names in 1961, named after The International Group, a privately owned wax and oil refinery that originated in Agincourt, ON.  The team won the 1941 Ontario Junior "C" Championship and won the Ontario Junior "B" Sutherland Cup Championship in 1969 and 1972.  At one point, the Waxers were the farm team of the National Hockey League's Toronto Maple Leafs and boasts over 100 NHL and World Hockey Association graduates.  The Waxers were formerly a part of the Metro Junior A Hockey League before joining the Ontario Provincial Junior A Hockey League.

During the 2002 Season the Waxers celebrated 100 years of association with the OHA. They had special 3rd jerseys made up and all players were numbered from 100–198, by adding a 1 to the front of the player's regular number. One of these jerseys was donated to the Hockey Hall of Fame, as they believe only one other team in history has ever used such numbering for its players. They finished that season by winning the South Division championship the franchise's first Championship in many years.

On August 1, 2012, the Waxers announced they were suspending operations for the 2012–13 season.

On June 15, 2013, the Ontario Junior Hockey League announced that the Markham Waxers had their membership terminated. The Waxers failed to fulfill several obligations required by the league and the governing Ontario Hockey Association.  The OJHL mentioned that Markham has a rich tradition in junior hockey and would like to see a team back in Markham for the 2014–15.

On April 29. 2015, the City of Markham held a major Press conference and the Mayor announced, to a large jubilant crowd, that the Hamilton Red Wings Jr A Hockey Club was relocating to Markham. The Hockey Club acquired the rights to the Waxers Junior A, and has opted to play in the OJHL as the Markham Royals. The Royals were the sister club of the Waxers dating back to the 1970s.

The OJHL's Markham Royals will begin league play in the 2015–16 season reviving the rich tradition of Junior hockey in the City of Markham.

Sutherland Cup appearances
1968: Sarnia Legionnaires defeated Markham Waxers 4-games-to-none
1969: Markham Waxers defeated Strathroy Rockets 4-games-to-2
1972: Markham Waxers defeated St. Marys Lincolns 4-games-to-1

Notable alumni

Season-by-season results

Playoffs
Original OPJHL Years
1974 DNQ
1975 DNQ
1976 Lost Semi-final
Markham Waxers defeated Richmond Hill Rams 3-games-to-2 with 2 ties
North Bay Trappers defeated Markham Waxers 4-games-to-3
1977 Lost Semi-final
Markham Waxers defeated Toronto Nationals 4-games-to-none
North Bay Trappers defeated Markham Waxers 4-games-to-3
1978 DNQ
1979 Lost Quarter-final
Guelph Platers defeated Markham Waxers 4-games-to-none
1980 DNQ
1981 Lost Quarter-final
Belleville Bulls defeated Markham Waxers 4-games-to-1
1982 Lost Final
Markham Waxers defeated Aurora Tigers 4-games-to-1
Markham Waxers defeated Dixie Beehives 4-games-to-2
Guelph Platers defeated Markham Waxers 4-games-to-1
1983 Lost Quarter-final
Orillia Travelways defeated Markham Waxers 4-games-to-3
1984 Lost Quarter-final
Orillia Travelways defeated Markham Waxers 4-games-to-none
1985 Lost Semi-final
Markham Waxers defeated Dixie Beehives 4-games-to-1
Orillia Travelways defeated Markham Waxers 4-games-to-none
1986 Lost Final
Markham Waxers defeated Owen Sound Greys 4-games-to-1
Orillia Travelways defeated Markham Waxers 4-games-to-1
1987 Lost Semi-final
Owen Sound Greys defeated Markham Waxers 4-games-to-1
OJHL Years I
1994 Lost Preliminary
Cobourg Cougars defeated Markham Waxers 4-games-to-2
1995 Lost Preliminary
Lindsay Muskies defeated Markham Waxers 4-games-to-none
MetJHL Years
1996 Lost Quarter-final
Thornhill Islanders defeated Markham Waxers 4-games-to-1
1997 Lost Preliminary
Thornhill Islanders defeated Markham Waxers 4-games-to-3
1998 Lost Preliminary
Durham Huskies defeated Markham Waxers 3-games-to-1
OJHL Years II
1999 Lost Division Quarter-final
Aurora Tigers defeated Markham Waxers 3-games-to-1
2000 Lost Division Semi-final
Markham Waxers defeated North York Rangers 4-games-to-3
Vaughan Vipers defeated Markham Waxers 4-games-to-1
2001 Lost Division Semi-final
Markham Waxers defeated Oshawa Legionaires 4-games-to-none
Wexford Raiders defeated Markham Waxers 4-games-to-3
2002 Lost Division Semi-final
Markham Waxers defeated North York Rangers 4-games-to-3
St. Michael's Buzzers defeated Markham Waxers 4-games-to-none
2003 Lost Conference Final
Markham Waxers defeated Thornhill Rattlers 4-games-to-none
Markham Waxers defeated St. Michael's Buzzers 4-games-to-2
Markham Waxers defeated Wexford Raiders 4-games-to-3
Wellington Dukes defeated Markham Waxers 4-games-to-none
2004 Lost Division Semi-final
Markham Waxers defeated Couchiching Terriers 4-games-to-none
St. Michael's Buzzers defeated Markham Waxers 4-games-to-none
2005 Lost Division Semi-final
Markham Waxers defeated Pickering Panthers 4-games-to-2
Wexford Raiders defeated Markham Waxers 4-games-to-1
2006 Lost Division Final
Markham Waxers defeated Toronto Thunderbirds 4-games-to-1
Markham Waxers defeated Pickering Panthers 4-games-to-none
St. Michael's Buzzers defeated Markham Waxers 4-games-to-none
2007 Lost Division Semi-final
Markham Waxers defeated Durham Fury 4-games-to-none
St. Michael's Buzzers defeated Markham Waxers 4-games-to-3
2008 Lost Final
Markham Waxers defeated Toronto Dixie Beehives 3-games-to-none
Markham Waxers defeated Vaughan Vipers 4-games-to-none
Markham Waxers defeated St. Michael's Buzzers 4-games-to-2
Markham Waxers defeated Wellington Dukes 4-games-to-1
Oakville Blades defeated Markham Waxers 4-games-to-1
2009 Lost Division Semi-final
Markham Waxers defeated Cobourg Cougars 4-games-to-3
Toronto Jr. Canadiens defeated Markham Waxers 4-games-to-3
2010 Lost CCHL Quarter-final
Markham Waxers defeated Lindsay Muskies 4-games-to-2
Wellington Dukes defeated Markham Waxers 4-games-to-3
2011 Lost Round of 16
Stouffville Spirit defeated Markham Waxers 4-games-to-2
2012 Lost Division Semi-final
Markham Waxers defeated Huntsville Otters 3-games-to-none
Newmarket Hurricanes defeated Markham Waxers 4-games-to-2

References

External links
Markham Waxers

Ontario Provincial Junior A Hockey League teams
Sport in Markham, Ontario